In the United Kingdom, the Chairman of Ways and Means is a senior member of the House of Commons who acts as one of the Speaker's three deputies. The incumbent is Dame Eleanor Laing, MP for Epping Forest, who was first elected to the office on 8 January 2020.

History and functions
The Chairman of Ways and Means is the principal Deputy Speaker of the House of Commons, presiding over the House in the Speaker's absence. The chairman also takes the chair of the Committee of the Whole House. The chairman's title is derived from their role in the former Committee of Ways and Means, which was abolished in 1967.

The chairman's connection with the financial responsibilities of this committee gave rise to the tradition that the chairman presides over the annual budget debate, although there is no reason why the Speaker cannot do so if he or she chooses. The chairman is always a senior Member of the House, often with experience of chairing standing committees, and sometimes also of being a government minister.

Since 1902 the House has also appointed a first deputy chairman of ways and means, and since 1971 a second deputy chairman of ways and means. The deputy chairmen also deputise for the Speaker in the chair or by chairing committees of the Whole House, although the chairman has certain additional and distinct responsibilities (for instance, in relation to private bills and overseeing the Panel of Committee Chairs).

The chairman is also chair of the Court of Referees, established in 1865.

Once appointed, both the Chairman of Ways and Means and the deputy chairmen follow the same tradition of neither speaking nor voting on any matter before the House (unless a casting vote is required). Unlike the Speaker, though, they remain members of their political party and campaign in general elections as party politicians. The chairman and second deputy chairman are elected from the opposite side of the House to the (former) party of the Speaker, while the first deputy chairman comes from the same side. Because the four do not vote (except to break a tie), this effectively pairs the occupants of the chair (their presumed support for their side cancelling each other out), which means no party loses a voting advantage on account of having one of the four drawn from its ranks.

The traditional dress for male deputy speakers when presiding is morning dress (a black frock-coat, or a morning coat, with black waistcoat and grey and black striped trousers).

List of Chairmen of Ways and Means since 1826
Bold type and light grey colour indicates a chairman who was later elected as the Speaker of the House of Commons.

List of First Deputy Chairmen of Ways and Means (Deputy Chairman of Ways and Means 1902-1971)

List of Second Deputy Chairmen of Ways and Means since 1971

See also
 Committee of Ways and Means
 Speaker of the House of Commons

External links
Records of the Office of the Chairman of Ways and Means are held at the Parliamentary Archives
 Ways and Means in the parliamentary glossary
 Chairman of Ways and Means in the BBC parliamentary dictionary

References

Citations 

British House of Commons, Speakers of the
 
Westminster system
Parliament of the United Kingdom